The 1983 NCAA Division III baseball tournament was played at the end of the 1983 NCAA Division III baseball season to determine the eighth national champion of college baseball at the NCAA Division III level. The tournament concluded with six teams competing at Pioneer Park in Marietta, Ohio, for the championship. Six regional tournaments were held to determine the participants in the World Series. Regional tournaments were contested in double-elimination format, with one region consisting of six teams, four regions consisting of four teams, and one region consisting of two teams, which was played as best-of-five, for a total of 24 teams participating in the tournament.

Bids
The 24 competing teams were:

Regionals

West Regional
Turlock, CA (Host: Stanislaus State College)

Stanislaus State (3–2),
La Verne (2–3)

Mid-Atlantic Regional
Montclair, NJ (Host: Montclair State College)

Montclair State (3–1),
William Paterson (3–2),
Upsala (1–2),
Salem State (0–2)

South Regional
North Carolina Wesleyan (4–1),
Lynchburg (2–2),
Methodist (1–2),
Salisbury State (0–2)

Northeast Regional
Ithaca, NY (Host: Ithaca College)

Eastern Connecticut State (3–0),
Ithaca (2–2),
Ramapo (1–2),
Worcester State (0–2)

Midwest Regional
Oshkosh, WI (Host: University of Wisconsin-Oshkosh)

Otterbein (3–1),
Wisconsin-Oshkosh (3–2),
Concordia (MN) (1–2),
Washington-St. Louis (0–2)

Mideast Regional
Burlington, IA

Marietta (4–0),
North Park (3–2),
Ohio Northern (2–2),
Luther (1–2),
Elizabethtown (0–2),
Monmouth (IL) (0–2)

World Series

Participants

Bracket
Pioneer Park-Marietta, OH (Host: Marietta College)

References

NCAA Division III Baseball Tournament
Tournament